Weybread is a village in Suffolk, England.

The population of the village at the 2011 Census was 432.

Its church, St. Andrew's, is one of 38 existing round-tower churches in Suffolk.

Weybread formerly had three public houses; the Chequers and the Horseshoe have since closed, leaving only one, the Weybread Crown.

Murders 
On 3 June 2016 Peter and Sylvia Stuart of Brick Kiln Cottage, Mill Lane were reported missing. The body of Peter Stuart was found the same day in nearby woodland. The body of Sylvia Stuart has never been found. Ali Qazimaj, 42, of Tilbury, Essex, was tried, found guilty, and sentenced to 35 years imprisonment for the double murder.

Notable people

Alfred Ablett VC DCM (3 August 1830 – 12 March 1897), a Crimean War recipient of the Victoria Cross, was born in Weybread and is buried in the churchyard of St. Andrew's. He was the first soldier from Suffolk to be awarded the Victoria Cross

References

External links

Diss Express - village's local newspaper website
Website with photos of Weybread St. Andrew, a round-tower church

Villages in Suffolk
Mid Suffolk District
Civil parishes in Suffolk